José Daniel Camillo (born September 9, 1968, in Brotas, São Paulo), better known as Daniel, is a Brazilian sertanejo and romantic singer and songwriter, and occasional actor.

Originally part of sertanejo duo João Paulo & Daniel, he has maintained a solo career since the untimely death of João Paulo in 1998. On June 5, 2012, he was confirmed as one of the coaches for the first season of upcoming reality television show The Voice Brasil.

His album As Músicas do Filme "O Menino da Porteira" won the 2010 Latin Grammy Award for Best Native Brazilian Roots Album.

His album Daniel won the 2017 Latin Grammy Award for Best Sertaneja Music Album. In 2021, his album Daniel em Casa was also nominated in the same category.

Discography

Throughout his entire career, Daniel has sold over 13 million records in total.

As João Paulo & Daniel
The duo João Paulo & Daniel sold more than 5 million records.

Studio albums

Live album

Compilation albums

As a solo artist
In his solo career, Daniel has sold more than 8,5 million records.

Studio albums

Live albums

Extended plays (EP)

Box set

Compilation albums

Filmography

References

External links
 
 

1968 births
Living people
20th-century Brazilian male singers
20th-century Brazilian singers
Musicians from São Paulo (state)
Spanish-language singers of Brazil
Latin Grammy Award winners
Sertanejo musicians
21st-century Brazilian male singers
21st-century Brazilian singers